Drag Race Thailand is a Thai reality competition show based on the American version with RuPaul. The series was licensed by the Kantana Group and premiered on 15 February 2018. The show is hosted by fashion stylist Art Arya, while drag performer Pangina Heals co-hosts.

In November 2022, O4 Media acquired the series from Kantana Group as part of the Drag Race franchise's expansion into other parts of Asia, including neighboring country Singapore. The third season's casting applications has not yet opened.

Thai Drag 
The co-host is drag queen Pangina Heals. Heals spoke about drag as an artform, saying "People are understanding that drag isn’t about sex or gender, but about performance and making other people happy." Heals also addressed the idea that drag and "ladyboys" are the same thing, saying "Thai people are really accepting of transgender girls, especially with the popularization of the Miss Tiffany's pageant shows."

Heals is the most famous drag queen in Thailand, dubbed the "RuPaul of Thailand", and was the winner of Thailand's first TV drag competition T-Battle.

Format

Maxi challenges
The maxi challenges usually takes place before the runway, where the queens must perform in various challenges for a prize that usually consists' of gift cards and vacations. The winner(s) of the maxi challenge are not exempt from elimination however, as that is determined via the runway challenge.

Runway challenges
Unlike RuPaul's Drag Race, Drag Race Thailand involves a runway challenge for the competitors, where their performance from the maxi challenge is tallied with their performance in the runway challenge. This determines the winner of the runway challenge, who will be safe from elimination. However, the bottom queens are usually determined through the runway challenge only.

Judging panel
A panel of judges cast opinions about the challenge performances and runway looks, first to the contestants onstage, and then again with them offstage.

Seasons

Season 1

The first season of Drag Race Thailand premiered on 15 February 2018, on LINE TV. The show was adapted from the American version RuPaul's Drag Race, with references and inclusion of RuPaul's music throughout the show. The winner of the first season was Natalia Pliacam, with B Ella winning Miss Congeniality.

Season 2

A casting announcement for season two was announced on 4 March 2018. A casting commercial was shown on September 13, 2018, and stated any genders were allowed to apply, as well as non-Thai citizens. The show premiered on 11 January 2019. The winner of the second season was Angele Anang, with Maya B'Haro winning Miss Congeniality.

Season 3
In July 2021, Piyarat Kaljaruek, Vice-President of the Kantana Group, announced on social media that Drag Race Thailand would be returning for a third season in 2022 to coincide with the 70th anniversary of the Kantana Group. In November 2022, however, Drag Race license owner and production company World of Wonder announced that O4 Media has acquired the series from Kantana Group.

References

Further reading

External links
 Drag Race Thailand at IMDb

 
2010s LGBT-related reality television series
2018 Thai television series debuts
Thai LGBT-related television shows
Thai reality television series
Thai television series based on American television series
Transgender-related television shows